Franklin D. Arms (March 11, 1872 – August 8, 1913) was an American football coach. He was the tenth head football coach at Wabash College in Crawfordsville, Indiana, serving for one season, in 1895, and compiling a record of 6–3.

Head coaching record

References

1872 births
1913 deaths
Wabash Little Giants football coaches
University of Illinois Urbana-Champaign alumni